2015 Elitettan was the 2015 season of the Swedish women's association football second-tier division, Elitettan.

Teams

League table

Results

Top scorers

References 

Elitettan seasons
2
Elitettan
Sweden
Sweden